For the community in Brazoria County, Texas see: Oyster Creek, Texas.

Likely Oyster Creek formerly rose at the mouth of Dolly's Gully on Jones Creek some 3500 feet to the SW prior to installation of control gates and a 350' channel from the (since removed) Second Lift pumping station by the Gulf Coast Water Authority, which utilizes the upper reaches of Oyster Creek to deliver municipal and irrigation water to various recipients in Fort Bend and Brazoria counties. 

Oyster Creek is north and east of, and roughly parallel to, the Brazos River. It originally flowed southeast 52 miles to the Gulf of Mexico in Brazoria County.  Portions of the stream no longer follow their natural course because in Missouri City the upper section has been partially channelized, ultimately connecting with the Brazos River via a short segment of Steep Bank Creek.

The lower section continues on its meandering path from about a mile southeast of Steep Bank Creek, draining into the Intracoastal Waterway north of Surfside Beach.

See also
List of rivers of Texas

Gallery

References

Rivers of Texas
Rivers of Fort Bend County, Texas
Rivers of Brazoria County, Texas